Events in the year 1977 in Germany.

Incumbents
President – Walter Scheel 
Chancellor – Helmut Schmidt

Events 
 Germany in the Eurovision Song Contest 1977
 24 June-2 October: documenta 6
 24 June - 5 July - 27th Berlin International Film Festival
5 September-18 October: Kidnapping and murder of Hanns-Martin Schleyer
 13 October - Lufthansa Flight 181 was hijacked by four members of the Popular Front for the Liberation of Palestine,
 German Autumn
 East German coffee crisis

Births
 January 15 - Ronald Zehrfeld, German actor
 February 22 - Jessica Wahls, German pop singer
 February 22
Claudia Hiersche, German actress
Timo Rose, German actor, director, and producer
 March 4 - Daniel Klewer, German footballer
 February 16 - Thomas Rupprath, German swimmer
 May 2 - Jan Fitschen, German athlete
 May 3 - Nicola Thost, German snowboarder
 May 5  Jessica Schwarz, German actress
 July 21 - Danny Ecker, German pole vaulter
 August 2 - Florian Stetter, German actor
 August 3 - Kristina Schröder, German politician
 August 29 - Jo Weil, German actor
 October 16 - Björn Otto, German pole vaulter
 November 28 - Claus von Wagner, German comedian and cabaret performer
 December 19 - Samy Deluxe, German singer

Deaths
January 6 - Hanns Lilje,  Lutheran bishop (born 1899)
January 18 - Carl Zuckmayer, German writer and playwright (born 1896)
February 22 - Otto Graf, German actor (born 1896)
March 4 - Lutz Graf Schwerin von Krosigk, German politician (born 1887)
April 7 Karl Ritter, German film producer (born 1888)
April 7 - Siegfried Buback, Attorney General of Germany  (born 1920)
May 5 - Ludwig Erhard, politician (born 1897)
May 5 - Erich Campe, German boxer (born 1912)
May 13 — Otto Deßloch, German Luftwaffe general and Knight's Cross recipient (born 1889)
June 16 - Wernher von Braun, German, later American, aerospace engineer, and space architect (born 1912)
June 16 - Werner Eggerath, German politician and writer (born 1900)
June 30 - Paul Hartmann, German actor (born 1889)
July 30 - Jürgen Ponto, German bankier (born 1923)
August 4 - Ernst Bloch, German philosopher (born 1885)
August 28 - Peter Altmeier, politician (born 1899)
August 29 - Annemarie Steinsieck, actress (born 1889)
September 7 - Edgar Basel, German boxer (born 1930)
October 10 - Lea Grundig, German painter (born 1906)
October 18 - Hanns Martin Schleyer, business executive and employer and industry representative (born 1915)
October 26 - Elisabeth Flickenschildt, German actress (born 1905)
November 2 - Hans Erich Nossack, German writer (born 1901)
December 22 - Karl John, German actor (born 1905)

References

 
Years of the 20th century in Germany
1970s in Germany
Germany